Rylstone is a small town in New South Wales, Australia, in the Central Tablelands region within the Mid-Western Regional Council local government area. It is located on the Bylong Valley Way road route.

Etymology
The name 'Rylstone' has no clear origin; however, several possible origins are promoted.
 Michael Hayes who built the Shamrock Hotel and other buildings at The Junction (where the Cudgegong River and Tong Bong Creek meet) claims responsibility. On travelling through the area he mentioned sleeping on 'that Ryle Stone' his Irish accent converting what was actually said 'Royal Stone'
 A small village also known as Rylstone in Yorkshire England is near to where wool was sent from properties in the Rylstone area.
 Another tale suggests the Scots had a weapon called a Ryle Stone. This weapon being used when the Scots were at war with the Picts (England) and Scottish shepherds built their huts at the location of the current village of Rylstone.

A petition was sent to Governor Gipps asking for a village to be called Tong Bong to be established at the present site of Rylstone. Governor Gipps granted permission for the village to be surveyed but he insisted that the village be called Rylstone and not Tong Bong. There is no evidence of any connection between Governor Gipps and the English village of Rylstone.

Early maps spell Rylstone as Rylestone.

Exploration
Several early explorers and settler explorers travelled this area in the early 1800s; they include Samuel Marsden, Macquarie, Edward Cox, James Blackman Jr., Jamison, FitzGerald, John Nevell and James Vincent. Several mountains in the area commemorate their journeys through the Glen Alice Valley and up the Turon River.
James Blackman jnr. explored a route from Bathurst to the Cudgegong River and present site of Rylstone in 1820.
Allan Cunningham, the botanist and explorer, on his first expedition to find a route from Bathurst to the Liverpool Plains noted in his diary in November 1822 being in the Tabrabucka area and on the second expedition 18 April 1823 passing through Dabee (now Rylstone).

History
The district was originally known as Dabee (under various spellings). There are many contemporary newspaper references to the town being referred to as Ryalston in the period 1846 to mid-1850s then referred to as Ryalstone during the late 1850s. 
Rylstone town was laid out in 1846 by surveyor Davidson. By the 1850s Rylstone was becoming a well established town with post office, hotels, school, mills, and police lock-up. The Rylstone district was declared as a police district in 1854. 
Rylstone was formally proclaimed a town on 20 March 1885.

Railway

On 9 June 1884 the railway was opened to Rylstone, this changed the status of Rylstone village to that of a town. The railway yard included a goods shed, trucking yards, and turntable. Notably, Henry Lawson's father, Niels Hertzberg Larsen, helped build the timber railway station. The line was extended from Rylstone to Mudgee and this section was opened on 10 September 1884. Rylstone is located on the Wallerawang to Gwabegar branch line.

In April 1895 a railway telephone line was installed between Wallerawang and Mudgee with Rylstone as an intermediate telephone point. The telephone was an important safety feature on this railway due to the steep cliffs and tunnels that occur on both sides of Rylstone allowing quick and clear communication of problems.

The railway line through Rylstone was closed on 2 March 1992 and remain closed for 8 years, the NSW Government spent $11 million to resleeper the track, repair bridges, and level crossings reopening the line on 2 September 2000, the line was again closed 7 years later on 30 June 2007, the line remains closed; however, there are plans to reopen the line for coal trains to operate between Cobbora Mine (near Dunedoo) and the Mount Piper Power Station and Wallerawang Power Station.

On 24 October 2017 the NSW State Government announced that $1.1 million would be provided to reinstate the 8 km rail link between Kandos and Rylstone, thus enabling tourist trains to access the resulting 'Kandos-Rylstone Rail Heritage Precinct'. Refurbishment work, which includes replacing 3,500 old timber sleepers with long-life steel, is expected to commence in April 2018 and continue for six months.

Bridges
Four road bridges have spanned the Cudgegong River which flows through the town. The first bridge was a suspension bridge that was washed away by floods around 1867. This was followed by a second bridge of two spans built by a Mr Hayden soon after the flood. This second bridge was alongside the first bridge at the end of Hall Street. A third bridge built by Mr Eddy Fitzgerald replaced the second in 1890 and was a little further up the River. The fourth bridge, and the only one remaining, which is still used today was built in 1948 to line up with the Bylong Road.
A railway bridge also spans the Cudgegong River approximately 100 metres upriver of the present road bridge. This apart from upgrading works, to add additional centre pillars, is the original structure built during the construction of the line.

Hotels
By 1868 there were four Hotels, the Rylstone Hotel, Bridge View, Shamrock and the Globe. The Rylstone and Globe Hotels remain in business.
The Shamrock Hotel was located on the southern side of the railway bridge and was built by Michael Hayes in 1885 closing in 1890.

Aboriginal history
The local indigenous Aboriginals were the Dabee tribe and they in turn were part of the broader Wiradjuri group of people. Some of the localities in the area are derivations of Aboriginal words.
 Lue (chain of waterholes) believed to be pronounced in the Aboriginal language like Loowee
 Mudgee believed to derive from Moothi meaning nest in the hills
 Dabee - name of the local Aboriginal Tribe and the Fitzgerald's property was named after
 Wollemi - is derived from an aboriginal word meaning "watch out" or "look around you"
 Cudgegong - meaning red hill, noted for the red clay used by the Aborigines in body decoration
 Tong Bong, pronounced "Tung Bung"
One of the last full blooded Aborigines of the Rylstone area was Peggy Lambert wife of Jimmy Lambert, she was buried in the Aboriginal section of the Rylstone Cemetery in June 1884. Another local Aboriginal was Jimmy McDonald who was attached to the Rylstone Police station as a tracker.

Early settlers and properties

 Richard Fitzgerald 1772-1840 (of Dabee Station) - an Irish political prisoner who became an emancipist
 Robert Fitzgerald (son of Richard) 1807-1865
 Edward Cox (of Rawdon Station)
 Daniel Cox (of Balmoral, Nullo Mountain) - Daniel Cox sailed from England as a convict on 16 August 1830
 John Nevell (of the property Carwell)
 John Thompson 1796-1873 and son William Barber Thompson 1821-1889 (Davis Swamp Holding, later named Olinda)
 Harry Thompson (of Warleigh to become Woodlands, near Nullo Mountain) no relation to the above Thompsons
 Thomas Harris (of Loowee, property that later became Lue and Monivae)

Buildings and businesses
Early buildings were constructed of timber slabs and stringy bark, later wattle and daub became common. Plentiful sandstone in the area led to significant buildings being constructed of that material. 
 The Butter Factory - when closed it became the Freezing Works
 The Rabbit Factory - building demolished
 Cordial Factory - built in 1880 and owned by Mr JN Collins of Mudgee
 Court House and Gaol - built in 1870
The main commercial street, Louee Street, was originally an upper level and lower level street. In the 1930s the street was levelled and this created the high steps to the buildings on the high side of the road.

Other events in Rylstone history

1849 - Post Office opened on 1 January 1849.
1853 - Wesleyan Chapel opened on Sunday 15 May 1853
1857 - laying of foundation stone for new church, St James Rylstone on 19 May 1857
1857 - The School opened in July 1857.
1875 - Rylstone and district population was approximately 300 persons
1879 - Dr Dame Constance D'Arcy, a leading Sydney obstetrician and gynaecologist, born in Rylstone.
1880 - Telegraph Office was built and the Post Office relocated to this building
1894 - Gold discovered in Rylstone area, gold showing freely through reef, a gold rush results, 21 August 1894
1897 - A 70 oz gold nugget was found between Stony Pinch and Appletree Flat
1899 - Rylstone and other nearby towns promote themselves as a suitable site for the new Federal Capital
1903 - Coal was discovered for the first time by New Zealand mining company at Coomber (5 miles south of Rylstone)
1906 - A telephone line was opened between Rylstone and Mudgee, 1 February 1906
1907 - Iron and Steel manufacturing works proposed for Rylstone
1914 - A 50 line telephone switchboard was opened at Rylstone on 28 October
1915 - in April 1915 a new telephone line was constructed between Rylstone and Bylong
1915 - Tenders accepted for construction of a new hospital at Rylstone, £1723, 27 April 1915
1924 - A new direct telephone trunk line was built from Lithgow to Rylstone and on to Mudgee, prior to this date all calls to Sydney were connected via Switchboards at Rylstone, Mudgee, Bathurst then Sydney
1925 - The Rylstone school is destroyed by fire during school hours, no one is hurt, 6 August 1925
1925 - The Standard Portland Cement Company's Kandos Cement Works are under construction
1926 - An electrification scheme commenced for the towns of Rylstone and Kandos, power being supplied by the Kandos Cement Works, connection switched on in November 1926.
1926 - record rainfall of 1250 points (317mm) falling in a week (rain commencing 25 March 1926), washing out the Tong Bong crossing
1931 - Rich Shale Oil discovery at Rylstone
1935 - Hospital additions, new wing and nurses quarters were opened by Minister for Health on 3 August 1935, costing £1700
1938 - Discussions with NSW Government commenced on provided a water supply scheme for Rylstone.
1954 - A water supply dam was completed and pipes were installed to connect the town to running water
1960s - A sewage system was built and connected to houses and businesses in Rylstone
1981 - Saturday 30 May, the last Mudgee Mail train service ran through Rylstone around 4am, heading north to Gwabegar
1983 - The manual telephone switchboard closed in June, it was located in the Post and Telegraph Office
1992 - 2 March, the railway line from Kandos through Rylstone to Gulgong closed to rail traffic
2000 - 2 September, The railway line from Kandos through Rylstone to Mudgee and Gulgong was reopened to train traffic
2007 - 30 June, The railway line from Kandos to Gulgong was classified as 'service suspended' effectively closing the line to trains

Heritage listings 
Rylstone has a number of heritage-listed sites, including:
 28-30 Louee Street: Bridge View Inn
 Wallerawang-Gwabegar railway: Rylstone railway station

Recent events
The Rylstone District was governed by a separate local government area known as the Rylstone Shire Council which was formed on 5 December 1906. Prior to that the area was administered by the Department of Public Works. In 2004 the New South Wales Government conducted an inquiry that found evidence of deteriorating finances as well as breaches of regulations in appointments and management of staff. It ruled all civic offices to be vacated and appointed an Administrator to manage Councils affairs. The council's relatively small area was ultimately amalgamated with the Mudgee Shire Council in March 2006 to become the Mid Western Regional Council.

Services

Government
Rylstone's newly renovated and extended small rural hospital known as a Multipurpose Service provides emergency services, acute and subacute medical inpatient services and low and high care residential aged care services. HealthOne Rylstone is collocated with the Multipurpose Service providing General Practitioner services.

The town also has a police station where two officers are based, this station is under the control of the Orana-Mid Western Police District.

Rylstone Court House operates a Government Access Service (GAS) providing a range of transactions on behalf of various state government agencies

Energy supply to Rylstone is provided by Integral Energy, prior to this Turon County Council, and earlier Rylstone Shire Council provided the electricity infrastructure.

Radio and television
A not for profit community radio station serves the Rylstone and Kandos area, KRR-FM broadcasts from Mount Coombermellon on frequency 98.7 MHz. Real-FM/2MG from Mudgee is the licensed commercial area broadcaster, Real-FM rebroadcasts its signal into Rylstone and Kandos on 97.9 MHz.

Television services are provided by the ABC, SBS, and commercial television broadcasting in the Central Tablelands and Central Western Slopes license area. The broadcasters in this license area are CBN10 (Prime Television), CTC63 (Southern Cross Television), WIN66 (WIN Television). The transmitters are located on Mount Coombermellon. Due to the hilly terrain there are many terrestrial television reception black spots particularly to the north and east of Rylstone, these areas are within the Remote Central & Eastern Australia Broadcast Licence Area and the signal is received by satellite.

Industry and agriculture
Rylstone is predominantly an agricultural community with wool, sheep, cattle, wine grapes, and olives, being among the main pursuits. Coal mining and cement production are also significant employers in the community with these works being located in the nearby town of Kandos.

Area attractions and recreation
 Ganguddy, also known as Dunns Swamp - is a camping and picnic area on the banks of the Cudgegong River on the western edge of Wollemi National Park. Ganguddy/Dunns Swamp is 20 kilometres from Rylstone. The area has bushwalking, fishing, swimming and canoeing which can all be done from the camping area. In 1929 the Kandos Cement Works replaced a smaller weir built lower on the River with a second wall to store water for piping to the Cement works, this wall created the water storage area known as Dunns Swamp,  now referred to as Ganguddy.
 Ferntree Gully - is a rainforest area 17 kilometres north of Rylstone. Walking tracks take visitors down into cool narrow fern tree-studded valley floor and unusual rock formations
 Wollemi National Park - is the second largest national park in New South Wales, and contains a large part of the Wollemi Wilderness area.
 Nullo Mountain - is a high mountain plateau to the north of Dunns Swamp with views over the Wollemi Wilderness and the Widden Valley.
 Lake Windamere - a large water supply dam with camping facilities, used for water sports and fishing
 Historic streetscape - The town has several old stone buildings, especially in Louee Street

Rylstone has retained its original character buildings from its beginnings, a few buildings of note are the Bridge View Inn, the Globe Hotel, the post office, the police station, the courthouse and the shire hall. The old town granary was built in the early 1840s.

Rylstone is a venue for ultralight aviation, gyrocopters, and paragliding enthusiasts. The Rylstone Airstrip is used for this activity. The Airstrip was sold by the Mid Western Regional Council to a private individual who intends to keep the strip for aviation purposes.

Tourism
Rylstone is becoming a destination for travellers on a new tourist route that has developed following the final sealing of the Bylong Valley Way. The sealing of the route was commenced in 1950 and only completed in April 2009. A large part of the Bylong Valley Way route lies between the Wollemi and Goulburn River National Parks, with its scenery and animal and bird life the route is becoming popular with weekend travellers. Business associations and local governments in the area are promoting the journey to develop the tourist potential. With the completion of the work Rylstone has seen a steady increase in tourists visiting its cafes, pubs, and bed and breakfast establishments. A route is now available from Sydney through the Hunter Region and return to Sydney via Rylstone providing a tourist loop.

Mining and exploration
The Rylstone area is rich in natural mineral resources including coal, it is located on the western coalfield which extends from near Lithgow to Rylstone. Rylstone is an undeveloped coal resource and one of the last to be exploited. Charbon Coal Mine is a working mine approximately 10 km to the south of Rylstone. Large reserves of coal are known to exist, which is mostly thermal coal suitable for local coal-fired power stations. The NSW Minerals Department states that this resource will be allocated for developed in the short-term future.
Cement was produced at the nearby Kandos Cement Works using limestone and clay raw materials from a mine situated 5 km to the east of Kandos.
Recent explorations have revealed prospective deposits of rare-earth elements, a company is proposing further analysis of these mineral deposits.

District events
The Rylstone and District Agricultural Show happens late February each year. The RDAS was formed and the first show was held on 17 April 1937. Prior to that, the Rylstone Horticultural Society formed 1 August 1892 ran shows, with the first show occurring 9 November 1892.

The Rylstone Street Feast is a food and wine event that occurs each November. Rylstone main street is closed and tables and stalls are set up along the street. The event showcases the region's produce.

Established in 2011, the Rylstone Classic is an annual motoring event attracting over 200 classic Mini vehicles to the region. The two-day event departs from the Central Coast of New South Wales and tours the scenic roads of the mid-west, travelling either via the south through the Blue Mountains or via the north through the Bylong Valley. The overnight event centres activities on the town's central pub, the Globe Hotel Rylstone and brings almost 400 tourists to the area and surrounds.

Climate
Rylstone does not have a local weather station so the statistics are taken from the Mudgee weather station (approximately 42 km north west). Average temperatures range between 15 and 40 degrees Celsius in the summer (December - February) and -3 and 15 degrees Celsius in the winter (June–August).

Access
Vehicle
 From the Hunter Region travel west along the Golden Highway and turn onto the Bylong Valley Way 1 km before Sandy Hollow.
 From Ilford travel 2 km north along the Castlereagh Highway and turn onto the Bylong Valley Way.
Road/Rail
 A NSW TrainLink coach service operates each way daily connecting at Lithgow with the Blue Mountains Line interurban train service to Sydney
Air
 The nearest commercial air services are operated from Mudgee Airport (56 km by road) and are provided by Aeropelican

Gallery

See also
Nearby towns and villages
 Kandos
 Mudgee
Lue
Clandulla
Charbon
 Bylong
 Ilford
Related Wikipedia sites
 Electoral district of Rylstone
Other Rylstone-related links
 Boer War Hero, Lieutenant W.V. Dowling, resident of Rylstone
 Anzac (Dardanelles) Hero from Rylstone, Captain Edward Dawson, Killed in action at Lone Pine, central Anzac, on 6–8 August 1915, aged 35. Grave: Lone Pine cemetery
 Anzac (Dardanelles) Hero from Rylstone, Alfred Robbins Died in hospital in Greece from wounds received at Gallipoli 30 June 1915, aged 35.

References

External links

Rylstone & District Historical Society
 Rylstone Region Tourist Site
 Ferntree Gully Reserve
 Rylstone and District Historical Society wiki
VISITNSW.com - Rylstone
The Rylstone Classic

Towns in New South Wales
Central Tablelands
Mid-Western Regional Council